Bradshaw may refer to:

Places 
Canada
Bradshaw, Lambton County, Ontario

United Kingdom
Bradshaw, Calderdale, West Yorkshire
Bradshaw, Kirklees, West Yorkshire, a location
Bradshaw, Greater Manchester
Bradshaw, Staffordshire, a location
Bradshaw Brook, a river in Northern England

United States
Bradshaw Mountains, a mountain range in Arizona
Bradshaw Mountain Railroad, a railroad in Arizona
Bradshaw Mountain High School, school in Arizona
Bradshaw Trail, an overland stage route in Southern California
Bradshaw, Maryland
Bradshaw, Nebraska
Bradshaw, Virginia
Bradshaw, Logan County, West Virginia
Bradshaw, McDowell County, West Virginia

Elsewhere
Bradshaw Field Training Area, Australian army training ground
Bradshaw Station, a pastoral lease in the Northern Territory of Australia
Bradshaw Sound, a fiord in New Zealand
Mount Bradshaw, a mountain peak in Antarctica
Port Bradshaw Peninsula, alternative name for Yalangbara Peninsula, Yalangbara, Northern Territory, Australia
Robert L. Bradshaw International Airport, in Saint Kitts

People
Bradshaw (surname), people with the surname Bradshaw
Barbara Bradshaw Smith,  (1922-2010) Relief Society president for The Church of Jesus Christ of Latter-day Saints
Bradshaw Crandell, (1896-1966) American artist
Bradshaw Dive, (1865-1946) New Zealand politician
George Bradshaw Kelly, (1900-1971) American politician
James Bradshaw Adamson, (1921-2003) American military leader
John Bradshaw Gass, (1855-1939) English architect and artist
Bradshaw (wrestler), (born 1966) the ring name of professional wrestler John Layfield
The Bradshaws, a fictional family on Piccadilly Radio

Organisations
Bradshaw Gass & Hope, an English architecture firm
Bradshaw International, an American cookware company
Hamilton Bradshaw, a British private equity firm
Henry Bradshaw Society, a British publishing company

Other uses 
8223 Bradshaw, an asteroid discovered in 1996
Gwion Gwion rock paintings (former colonial name "Bradshaws"), Australian rock art
Bradshaw Lecture, a lecture series delivered at the Royal College of Physicians and Royal College of Surgeons
Franklin Bradshaw murder, a 1978 murder in Utah
Bradshaw model, which describes river mechanics
 Bradshaw's, railway timetables and travel guides named after the English publisher George Bradshaw

See also 
 

Brad Shaw (born 1964), Canadian ice hockey player and coach